The Hard Way is a novel by Lee Child, first published in 2006.

Plot summary
In a downtown Manhattan coffee shop Jack Reacher watches a man unlock a Mercedes and drive away. 24 hours later, in the same coffeehouse, he's approached, interrogated, and then driven to The Dakota where he meets Edward Lane and five ex-military soldiers, part of Lane's private mercenary army. Lane offers Reacher payment for his eye-witness description of the guy who stole the car; hearing that Reacher is an ex-Army CID investigator, Lane offers him a million dollars to help find his wife Kate (and, as an afterthought, Kate's daughter Jade). The pair, along with the chauffeur Graham Taylor (a British ex-SAS employee), disappeared while on a shopping trip to Bloomingdale's.

The kidnapper initially tells Lane to put $1 million in his Mercedes and park it near the coffee shop where Reacher had been sitting - the man Reacher had seen drive off was the kidnapper. After the ransom retrieval the victims are not returned. The kidnappers subsequently ask for $5 million and then an additional 4.5 million. The total comprises half the $21 million haul Lane had netted in an African operation. Kate and Jade are not returned.

Lane's first wife, Ann, had also been kidnapped; she'd been found a month later, dead in a vacant lot. Patti Joseph, Ann's sister, is convinced Lane had ordered Ann's murder (disguised as a kidnapping) because she'd asked for a divorce and a hefty settlement. Patti watches Lane's apartment month after month and passes info to an NYPD detective who passes it along to Lauren Pauling, a retired FBI agent who'd worked the first kidnapping.

(As Lane's African operation had been drawing to an ignominious close, Lane engineered the death of the mercenary he'd had kill Ann by leaving him and a second mercenary to be captured and killed, contrary to the military's vow to "bring every man home.")

The police find a body floating in the Hudson; everybody assumes it is the chauffeur Graham Taylor. The kidnappers don't call. It's assumed Kate and Jade are dead.

Pauling has a Pentagon contact who tells Reacher that Ann's murderer, Knight, and a second mercenary, Hobart had suffered terribly in prison camp. Knight died, the other - Clay James Hobart- made it back to the States.

Pauling and Reacher find Hobart living with his widowed sister (Dee Marie Graziano), whose door they break down, only to discover Hobart is near death after the prison camp torture: he's emaciated, toothless, a quadruple amputee, ill with malaria and tuberculosis. Dee Marie was the woman who visited Kate in the Hamptons, warning her about Lane.

Lane, through his own channels, finds out Hobart survived; his men fan out searching hospitals - it's clear that Hobart, though innocent, is a loose end and will be killed if found. Pauling and Reacher rush to warn Hobart and Dee Marie to flee, but it's too late, Lane and his men are outside. Reacher heads them off and tells Lane that for $1 million he'll deliver the kidnapper's name the following day. He tells Pauling he'll use the money to pay her and to pay for a good clinic, rehab, and an apartment for Hobart.

They figure out that Graham Taylor, Kate and Jade's chauffeur when they were kidnapped, was the kidnapper. He concealed his English accent by faking mutism and hid the victims in his own apartment. He's now flown back to England so Reacher, Lane, and all the henchmen follow.

Reacher has brought the phone number of Taylor's closest relative (found as a speed dial shortcut) and a local detective locates Taylor's sister, Susan Jackson, living on a newly-purchased, isolated farm in Norfolk. Pauling and Reacher drive out there, confirm Taylor's presence, and return to London. Reacher demands the promised million from Lane in exchange for the address, but as he's describing the location he suddenly realizes Kate left New York of her own free will and she and Jade are at the Jackson farm; Taylor had rescued, not kidnapped, them. Reacher races Lane and his men back to Norfolk and the showdown ends with Lane and his men dead and buried on the farm where Kate and Jade now live with Taylor and his sister's family, using the ransom money to make reparation for others like Hobart.

2006 British novels
American thriller novels
Jack Reacher books
Novels by Lee Child
Bantam Press books
G. P. Putnam's Sons books